Roger Jones is a Welsh international lawn bowler and former British champion.

Bowls career
Jones is twice winner of the Welsh National Bowls Championships singles in 2008 and 2017. After the 2008 victory he subsequently won the singles at the British Isles Bowls Championships in 2009. 

In 2013, he won a silver medal at the European Bowls Championships in Spain. He also won the National pairs with John Berry for the Pantaeg Park Bowls Club before switching clubs to Beaufort BC in late 2016, where he won the National fours in 2018.

References

Living people
Welsh male bowls players
Year of birth missing (living people)